Market Village was a  shopping mall in Markham, Ontario, Canada. Opened in 1990 and expanded in 1995, the mall closed on March 1, 2018.

Features
The mall was composed of nine buildings, which incorporated a combination of indoor and outdoor pedestrian malls. Most stores in Market Village were family-run, though there were several non-Chinese retailers, and some stores with links to Hong Kong. Major anchor stores included two Chinese supermarkets, branches of the Bank of Montreal and HSBC Bank and McDonald's. At its peak, there were 170 stores and businesses in Market Village; roughly 120 businesses were still in operation in 2014.

Proposed expansion & closure

On June 15, 2005, Pacific Mall and Market Village announced a 400,000 square foot (37,000 square meter) expansion that would add additional retail space, a luxury hotel, condominiums, and a multi-level parking structure. The expansion would see the entirety of Market Village be demolished and replaced with a new mall, the Remington Centre. The initial plan was endorsed by Markham City Council in 2011.

The expansion has faced delays due to concerns over traffic congestion from nearby property owners, as well as a pending environmental assessment and transit study by the City of Toronto government. Prior to Market Village's impeding closure, only minimal maintenance and repairs were being done; many businesses closed or moved after store leases expired and were not renewed. Market Village announced in early 2017 that it would be hosting its final Chinese New Year celebration, and formally closed on March 1, 2018. Demolition of Market Village officially began in October 2018 with west wing of mall demolished in December 2018. Some retailers from the mall have moved north to Denison Centre, a smaller plaza located at Kennedy Road and Denison Street. In 2019, the whole mall has been demolished.

Gallery

References

External links

Market Village  
The Evolution of Steeles and Kennedy

Chinese-Canadian culture in Ontario
Shopping malls established in 1990
Shopping malls disestablished in 2018
Defunct shopping malls in Canada
Buildings and structures in Markham, Ontario
1990 establishments in Ontario
2018 disestablishments in Ontario
Buildings and structures demolished in 2018
Demolished buildings and structures in Ontario